The West Himalayan bush warbler (Locustella kashmirensis) is a species of Old World warbler in the family Locustellidae.
It is found in the northwestern Himalayas.

It was previously considered conspecific with the spotted bush warbler.

Its natural habitat is temperate forests.

References

West Himalayan bush warbler
Birds of North India
West Himalayan bush warbler